Mateo González Manrique was a soldier who served as governor of West Florida between 1813 and 1815. During his administration he helped the British in their fight against the Americans in the War of 1812, providing them with troops and slaves, and allowed them to garrison British troops in the fortifications at Pensacola, capital of West Florida. He thereby earned the enmity of Andrew Jackson, who invaded the city in 1814, although he returned it to Manrique after the British fled.

Career 
Manrique joined the Spanish army in his youth, rising to the ranks of lieutenant colonel and sergeant major. In 1813, Manrique was appointed governor of Spanish West Florida.

War of 1812 

Although the Spanish government was officially neutral during the War of 1812, Manrique assisted the British with material aid and allowed them to use the Spanish fortifications at Barrancas and Saint Michael as well as to supply their Native American allies.

According to historian Sean Michael O'Brien, Manrique, fearing a possible attack by Jackson's forces, invited Edward Nicolls, an Anglo-Irish officer of the British Royal Marines, to land his troops at Pensacola, where they soon took control of the port. Nicolls tried to recruit the Seminoles as allies against the United States, operating from a position occupied in April 1814 at Prospect Bluff. When Nicolls arrived at Prospect Bluff in August with 300 British uniforms and 1000 muskets, Manrique, fully aware of the threat the Americans posed to Florida, requested the redeployment of British forces to Pensacola. Manrique cooperated with Nicolls, allowing him to train and equip Creek refugees. In addition to the Seminoles and Creek, Nicolls and the British military officer George Woodbine recruited about 500 Red Sticks (also referred to as "Redsticks"), Seminoles, and Blacks in Pensacola to serve in the British Army against the Americans.

Andrew Jackson criticized Manrique for allowing British agents to operate in Pensacola and warned him that he would consider him personally responsible for any depredations suffered by American citizens, and that he would encourage the Indians to take revenge against him.

Peter McQueen, a Métis and Creek chief, prophet, trader and warrior from Talisi, decided to confront the Americans over their frequent incursions on Creek lands. He demanded that Manrique supply him with ammunition, and warned that he would burn Pensacola to the ground if the governor did not cooperate. Manrique informed his superiors of the intention of McQueen and the Red Sticks to launch a war against the Americans. Manrique considered the Red Sticks to be an important ally against the American forces, although initially he had sent Spanish troops against them.

Jackson, believing that the British were conspiring with the Spanish and the Creeks against American interests, demanded that Manrique expel them from Florida. He then led an American army to seize the city, and arrived there on November 6, 1814. During the battle, the Spanish garrison offered little resistance to Jackson's assault. The British consequently abandoned Fort Barrancas and left Florida, fleeing with several hundred Indians in a British ship. Jackson considered that he had extinguished the conspiracy and returned Pensacola to Manrique.

According to historian Eric Beerman, in December 1814 prior to the Battle of New Orleans, Nicolls moved once again into Pensacola where he took Spanish soldiers and slaves as prisoners of war to use against the Americans in New Orleans campaign. Andrew Jackson, however, returned to Pensacola with his forces, forcing the British to retreat and Nicolls to keep the prisoners in the British headquarters at Prospect Bluff on the Apalachicola River, 250 kilometers east of Pensacola. Manrique sent Lt. Luis Urcullú with transport ships to negotiate a return of the prisoners, but was rebuffed. After the British defeat at the Battle of New Orleans in January 1815, Manrique instructed Captain Vicente Sebastian Pintado to travel to Apalachicola and confer with British vice-admiral Sir Alexander Cochrane. Cochrane agreed with Pintado, and ordered the return of all Spanish troops and slaves taken by the British to Pensacola aboard one of his ships under the command of Richard Spencer.

Manrique's term as governor of West Florida ended in 1815; he was replaced by José de Soto.

References

External links 
 The Block of 1812: A running documentary of the War of 1812. Letter to Mateo Gonzalez Manrique from Andrew Jackson

Royal Governors of La Florida
Spanish colonial governors and administrators
People of the War of 1812
Year of birth missing
Year of death missing